Greg Peters is an American businessman and the Co-CEO of Netflix.

Peters earned a BS degree in physics and astronomy from Yale University.

Netflix 
Peters joined Netflix on 2008 as the International Development Officer who was responsible for the global partnerships with consumer electronics companies, Internet service providers and multi-channel video programming distributors.

On July 2017, After his service as International Development Officer, he became the Chief Operating Officer and Chief Product Officer of Netflix

On 19 January 2023, He became the Co-CEO along with Ted Sarandos after Reed Hastings stepped down and became executive chairman.

References

Living people
Entertainment industry businesspeople
Netflix people
Yale University alumni
Year of birth missing (living people)